Ludwig Brousek (20 March 1908 – 14 August 1974) was an Austrian footballer. He played in one match for the Austria national football team in 1935.

References

External links
 

1908 births
1974 deaths
Austrian footballers
Austria international footballers
Place of birth missing
Association football forwards